Torysh is a valley close to the village of Shetpe and the mountain Sherkala in Western Karatau, Kazakhstan. Also known as "The Valley of Balls", the area features many spherical rock formations which have formed naturally across the landscape in the sedimentary rock, through a concretion process.

References

Rock formations of Kazakhstan